Gustavo Segundo Moscoso Huencho (born August 10, 1955) is a former football player from Chile, who played as an attacking midfielder and/or striker.

Career
Born in the saltpeter work ("saltpeter office" in Chile) close to Tocopilla called , Moscoso represented Chile at under-20 level in the 1975 South American Championship. A player of Universidad Católica, he represented Chile at the 1982 FIFA World Cup, wearing the number eleven jersey.

Post retirement
Moscoso became a naturalized Mexican citizen in 2006. He was appointed as the manager of Puebla F.C. in April 2008. Next, he worked as the head coach of Mexican side Lobos de la BUAP.

References

External links
 Gustavo Moscoso at PartidosdeLaRoja 
 Profile
 
 

1955 births
Living people
People from Tocopilla Province
Chilean footballers
Chilean expatriate footballers
Chile international footballers
Chile under-20 international footballers
Club Deportivo Universidad Católica footballers
Club Puebla players
Atlético Morelia players
Tigres UANL footballers
Chilean Primera División players
Liga MX players
Chilean expatriate sportspeople in Mexico
Expatriate footballers in Mexico
1982 FIFA World Cup players
Association football forwards
Association football midfielders
Chilean football managers
Chilean expatriate football managers
Expatriate football managers in Mexico
Club Puebla managers
Lobos BUAP managers
Liga MX managers
Chilean emigrants to Mexico
Naturalized citizens of Mexico